UFA Fiction is a company founded in August 2013 for fiction film and television productions of the UFA based in Potsdam-Babelsberg. The company was created through the merger of the UFA subsidiaries , Phoenix Film and UFA Fernsehproduktion in the context of a restructuring of UFA and the strategic goal to bundle all companies under one brand in the future.

With UFA Fiction, all production activities of the UFA in the branch of series, TV movies, events and feature films are bundled in one company. Managing directors of UFA Fiction are Benjamin Benedict, Joachim Kosack, Markus Brunnemann, Sebastian Werninger and Joerg Winger.

References

External links
 

Companies based in Brandenburg
Companies based in Potsdam
Film production companies of Germany
Mass media companies established in 2013
German film studios